Radek Horák (born 8 January 1977) is a Czech former figure skater. He is a two-time Czech national champion (1996, 1998) and placed 24th at the 1998 European Championships in Milan. His skating club was TJ Stadion Brno.

Horák married Ukrainian-Russian pair skater Julia Obertas.

Competitive highlights

References 

1977 births
Czech male single skaters
Living people
Sportspeople from Most (city)